Bayrock may refer to:

 Bayrock (radio station), a radio station in New Zealand
 Bayrock Group, an international real estate development and investment company based in New York
 Bay Rock Light, an inactive lighthouse relocated from an island off Townsville, Australia

See also
 Bayrak (disambiguation)